Lawrence Aldred Mervyn Dundas, 3rd Marquess of Zetland (12 November 1908 – 5 October 1989) was a lawn tennis player of some note in the 1940s, known before 1961 as the Earl of Ronaldshay.

Dundas performed at the All England Championships, Wimbledon and in addition, was chairman of Catterick Bridge Racecourse and Redcar Racecourse for many years.  He lived at Aske Hall, near Richmond. He had been chosen as the Conservative candidate for the seat of Bath had an election been held in 1939/1940.

On 2 December 1936, he married Katherine Mary Penelope Pike, daughter of Col. Ebenezer John Lecky Pike, CBE, MC, and his wife, the artist Olive Constance Snell; they had four children:

Lawrence Mark Dundas, 4th Marquess of Zetland (b. 28 Dec 1937)
Lady Serena Jane Dundas (b. 10 Sept 1940 - d. 22 Nov 2012) married on 15 Aug 1964 to Captain Nigel Ion Charles Kettlewell.
Lord David Paul Nicholas Dundas (b. 2 Jun 1945) married, firstly, on 17 Dec 1971 to  Corinna Maeve Wolfe Scott; and, secondly, on 21 Nov 1997 to Taina Bettina Breuckmann.
Lord Richard Bruce Dundas (b. 6 Jan 1951) married, firstly, on 15 Jun 1974 to Jane Melanie Wright; and, secondly, on 9 April 1983 to Sophie Caroline Lascelles; and, thirdly, on 30 Jun 1995 to Ruth Anne Kennedy.

Like his father and grandfather before him, Dundas was educated at Harrow and Trinity College, Cambridge. His niece, Carolyne Christie, was married to Rock Scully, manager of The Grateful Dead, and later, in 1976, to Roger Waters of Pink Floyd. His nephew, Carolyne's younger brother Willie Christie, is a photographer and film director.

References

External links

http://www.thepeerage.com/p8123.htm#i81227 Col. Ebenezer John Lecky Pike

1908 births
1989 deaths
People educated at Harrow School
Alumni of Trinity College, Cambridge
British male tennis players
Conservative Party (UK) parliamentary candidates
Marquesses of Zetland
Place of birth missing